Samim Uygun (1939 – 25 December 2017) was a Turkish footballer. He competed in the men's tournament at the 1960 Summer Olympics.

References

External links
 
 

1939 births
2017 deaths
Turkish footballers
Olympic footballers of Turkey
Footballers at the 1960 Summer Olympics
Footballers from Istanbul
Association football forwards
Galatasaray S.K. footballers